Jesus Gonzalez (born September 19, 1991) is an American soccer player who plays for Los Angeles Force in the National Independent Soccer Association.

Career
On August 2, 2013, Gonzalez signed a professional contract with NASL club Atlanta Silverbacks

In 2017, Gonzalez joined California United FC II and was a key contributor to the club securing both the 2017 Spring & Fall United Premier Soccer League National Championships.

References

External links
 Silverbacks bio
 NISA Profile 2019-20
 NISA Profile 2020-

1991 births
Living people
American soccer players
Cal FC players
Atlanta Silverbacks players
Las Vegas Lights FC players
Los Angeles Force players
Association football midfielders
Soccer players from California
North American Soccer League players
National Independent Soccer Association players
United States men's under-20 international soccer players